Seoraksan National Park is a national park in South Korea. It is listed by the South Korean government with UNESCO as a tentative World Heritage site. The government designated the area as a nature reserve in 1965 and UNESCO designated it as a biosphere reserve in 1982. It was also the first Korean national park to be named under the National Park Law in 1970. Located on the east-central Korean peninsula, the reserve includes the Dinosaur Ridge, Injegun, Yanyanggun, and Sokchosi. It is popular with tourists and nature enthusiasts. It is home to many rare taxa of flora and fauna.

The ranges are composed largely of dissected granite and gneiss.

The park is valued for its floral diversity. There are about 1,013 species of plants known, with 822 vascular plant species. Pine trees such as the Siberian pine are abundant on the southern slope while the northern slopes of the mountain range are characterized by oaks and other deciduous trees. Thuja grow in the deep valleys. Dwarf pines and yews grow on low and high slopes. Juniper, hawthorn, and Manchurian fir can be found. Other plants include forsythias and saw-worts. Rare plants in the reserve include Hanabusaya asiatica.

1,562 animal species have been classified so far. Local fauna include otters, Siberian flying squirrel, kestrel, Chinese sparrowhawk, lenok, Chinese minnow, and spotted barbel. Endangered animal taxa include Tristram's woodpecker, Korean goral, and Korean musk deer.

Cultural landmarks in the reserve include the Buddhist temples Baekdamsa and Sinheungsa.

History

On 9-16 August 1991, the 17th World Jamboree was held in Mount Sorak. World Jamboree is the biggest event for boy/girl scouts and held every 4 years. In 1991 thousands of scouts from all over the world gathered in Mount Sorak to have fun in many activities and games, where they can exchange cultures, discuss environment or climate issues and create friendship.

See also 
 Seoraksan

References

External links

Seoraksan. Korea National Park Service.
 UNESCO
 World Heritage in Korea (pdf)

National parks of South Korea
Biosphere reserves of South Korea
Protected areas established in 1965
Parks in Gangwon Province, South Korea
World Heritage Tentative List